Batu Buli Hill is a mountain located in the Malaysian part of Borneo.  At 2,082 metres, it is one of the highest mountains in the state of Sarawak.

References

External links 
  Media konservasi, Volumes 6-10.Jurusan Konservasi Sumberdaya Hutan, Fakultas Kehutanan, IPB., 1999 - Indonesia

Mountains of Sarawak